Agustín Codazzi may refer to:
Agostino Codazzi, Italian military, veteran of Napoleonic Wars, scientist, geographer and cartographer
Agustín Codazzi, Cesar, a Colombian town named after Codazzi, who died there
Geographic Institute Agustín Codazzi, a Colombian cartographic institute